Eoscopus is an extinct genus of dissorophoidean euskelian temnospondyl in the family Micropholidae. It is known from Hamilton Quarry, a Late Carboniferous lagerstätte near Hamilton, Kansas.

Members of Micropholidae were historically included in Amphibamidae, but Schoch (2019) recovered Amphibamidae as paraphyletic, necessitating resurrection of Micropholidae for Micropholis and closely related taxa.

See also

 Prehistoric amphibian
 List of prehistoric amphibians

References

Amphibamids
Dissorophids
Prehistoric amphibian genera
Carboniferous amphibians of North America
Fossil taxa described in 1994